The 2010 FC Krasnodar season was the club's third season and their second season in the Russian First Division. They finished the season in fifth place, and earned promotion to the Russian Premier League, the highest tier of association football in Russia, after FC Saturn withdrew from the Premier League.

Squad

Transfers

Winter

In:

Out:

Summer

In:

Out:

Competitions

Overview

First Division

League table

Results summary

Results by round

Results

Russian Cup

Round 16 took place during the 2011–12 season.

Squad statistics

Appearances and goals

|-
|colspan="14"|Players away from the club on loan:

|-
|colspan="14"|Players who appeared for Krasnodar that left during the season:

|}

Goal Scorers

Clean sheets

Disciplinary record

References

FC Krasnodar seasons
FC Krasnodar